Leucochloron is a genus of flowering plant in the family Fabaceae. It belongs to the mimosoid clade of the subfamily Caesalpinioideae.

Species
Leucochloron comprises the following species:
 Leucochloron foederale
 Leucochloron minarum

References

Mimosoids
Fabaceae genera
Taxa named by James Walter Grimes
Taxa named by Rupert Charles Barneby
Taxonomy articles created by Polbot